The Kennecott Utah Copper rail line was an electric railroad in Salt Lake County, Utah. It was managed by the Kennecott Utah Copper Corporation and connected the Bingham Canyon Mine with its smelter at Garfield. The rail line has been replaced by a system of conveyors and a  slurry pipeline. Current rail operations by Kennecott Utah Copper LLC only occur in the area of the smelter, on a remnant of what was a vast rail network.

The electric rail line replaced the Bingham and Garfield Railway  (opened in 1911) in 1948. That earlier line was built for the same purpose, replacing the Bingham Branch and Garfield Beach Extension of the Denver and Rio Grande Railroad, which was not providing adequate service.

References

Utah railroads
Electric railways in Utah
1948 establishments in Utah